This list of protein subcellular localisation prediction tools includes software, databases, and web services that are used for protein subcellular localization prediction.

Some tools are included that are commonly used to infer location through predicted structural properties, such as signal peptide or transmembrane helices, and these tools output predictions of these features rather than specific locations. These software related to protein structure prediction may also appear in lists of protein structure prediction software.

Tools
 Descriptions sourced from the entry in the https://bio.tools/ registry (used under CC-BY license) are indicated by link

References 

Protein methods
Cell biology
Computational science
Protein
Protein targeting